Bogdanovci (Rusyn: Богдановци) is a village and municipality in the  Vukovar-Syrmia County in eastern Croatia. It is located a few kilometers south of Vukovar in eastern Slavonia. Bogdanovci is underdeveloped municipality which is statistically classified as the First Category Area of Special State Concern by the Government of Croatia.

Population

In the 2011 census, the total population is 1,960, in the following settlements:
 Bogdanovci, population 710
 Petrovci, population 864
 Svinjarevci, population 386

In the 2011 census there were:
 56.17% Croats,
 22.65% Rusyns,
 9.59% Serbs,
 7.55% Ukrainians,
 2.35% Albanians

References

External links
 

Populated places in Vukovar-Syrmia County
Municipalities of Croatia
Populated places in Syrmia